.pk is the designated Internet country code top-level domain (ccTLD) for Pakistan. PKNIC is the only organization endorsed by the Government of Pakistan to undertake the administration of 'pk' domain names.  PKNIC is a non-profit making, non-statutory, member-based corporation established in June 1992.

Domain categories 
All new domains that are registered under .pk must belong to one of the following second-level or third-level domains.

Urdu domain

In 2011 a new top domain was registered for Pakistan, intended for domain names in the local language. The domain, was approved by the ICANN Board on 7 January 2011 to represent Pakistan in the Perso-Arabic script. On 4 February 2011, IDN ccTLD پاکستان. was delegated to the National Telecommunication Corporation and the zone was added to the root servers in February 2017.

See also 
 Communications in Pakistan
 Internationalized domain name
 Telecommunications in Pakistan

Notes

References

External links
 PKNIC Official Website
 IANA .pk whois information

Country code top-level domains
Communications in Pakistan
Internet in Pakistan
Computer-related introductions in 1992